Trichomycterus areolatus is a species of pencil catfish endemic to Chile.  This species grows to a length of  TL.

Sources
 

areolatus
Freshwater fish of Chile
Taxa named by Achille Valenciennes
Taxonomy articles created by Polbot
Fish described in 1846